In Greek mythology, Menesthes (Ancient Greek: Μενέσθην means 'stay, wait') was a 'well-skilled' Achaean warrior who participated in the Trojan War. He and Anchialus, both riding a chariot, were killed by the Trojan hero Hector.

Note

References 

 Homer, The Iliad with an English Translation by A.T. Murray, Ph.D. in two volumes. Cambridge, MA., Harvard University Press; London, William Heinemann, Ltd. 1924. . Online version at the Perseus Digital Library.

 Homer, Homeri Opera in five volumes. Oxford, Oxford University Press. 1920. . Greek text available at the Perseus Digital Library.

Achaeans (Homer)